Helene Green Kirkegaard (born 5 May 1971) is a retired Danish badminton player from Lillerød badminton club. She competed at the 1996 and 2000 Summer Olympics. At the 1995 IBF World Championships, she won a silver medal in the mixed doubles with Jens Eriksen and a bronze medal in the women's doubles with Rikke Olsen.

Achievements

World Championships 
Women's doubles

Mixed doubles

World Cup 
Women's doubles

European Championships 
Women's doubles

European Junior Championships 
Girls' singles

Girls' doubles

IBF World Grand Prix
The World Badminton Grand Prix sanctioned by International Badminton Federation (IBF) since 1983.

Women's doubles

Mixed doubles

IBF International
Women's doubles

Mixed doubles

References

External links 
 

Living people
1971 births
People from Hillerød Municipality
Danish female badminton players
Badminton players at the 1996 Summer Olympics
Badminton players at the 2000 Summer Olympics
Olympic badminton players of Denmark
Sportspeople from the Capital Region of Denmark